Code Name: Jaguar (also known as The Spy Who Went Into Hell is a 1965 French/Spanish/West German international co-production Eurospy film directed by Maurice Labro in his penultimate feature film.  The film was co-written by French author  (pen name of Gaston-Claude Petitjean-Darville, born November 22, 1925 died 2004) based on Rank's 1964 novel of the same name.  The film stars Ray Danton, Pascale Petit and Roger Hanin and was shot in Alicante with interior studio work filmed in West Berlin.

Plot
Prior to his discovery and death, an American intelligence officer working undercover at a Soviet Naval base sends proof of the Russians filming American submarines off a joint US-Spanish naval base in San Juan, on the coast of Spain. American intelligence "Super Agent" Jeff Larson (Ray Danton) is sent to San Juan to investigate where he meets up with his former colleague Bob Stuart (Roger Hanin), and his Spanish contact, Pilar Perez (Pascale Petit). Larson (code name "Jaguar"), helps the American military discover remote controlled video cameras being used by the Soviets. These cameras are boobytrapped using sophisticated landmines, killing two Spanish sailors who tried to disarm one. Larson skin dives to clandestinely board a Soviet spy ship to discover that not only are they monitoring American submarines, but they are intercepting radio transmissions from the US-Spanish naval base as well as having a mole on the base. Larson successfully disarms a landmine protecting another video camera, saves the camera for analysis and hatches a plan to convert the landmine into a limpet mine and "return [it] to sender."  Throughout the escapade Larson survives several assassination attempts.

Cast 
Ray Danton 	... 	Jeff Larson
Pascale Petit ... 	Pilar Perez
Roger Hanin 	... 	Bob Stuart
Conrado San Martín 		... 	Comdr Luis Moreno
Manuel Gil 	... 	Clark
Horst Frank 	... 	Karl
Charles Régnier 	... 	Simon Walter
Wolfgang Preiss 	... 	Captain Parker
Carl Lange 	... 	Vassili Golochenko
Helga Sommerfeld 	... 	Lina Calderon
Grit Boettcher 	... 	Saskia 
Helga Lehner 	... 	Chambermaid
Günter Meisner 	... 	Russian officer on the Donetz 
Maryse Guy Mitsouko 	... 	Woman at hotel reception in green dress

Soundtrack
 A Lot of Livin' to Do
Music by Charles Strouse
Lyrics by Lee Adams
Sung by Ray Danton

References

External links

1965 films
1960s spy thriller films
Cold War spy films
Films based on French novels
French spy thriller films
Spanish spy thriller films
West German films
German spy thriller films
Films directed by Maurice Labro
1960s French films
1960s German films